Mazet-Saint-Voy is a commune in the Haute-Loire department in south-central France.

Geography
The river Lignon du Velay flows through the commune.

Population

Sights
Jardin botanique montagnard

See also
Communes of the Haute-Loire department

References

Communes of Haute-Loire